What's New, Scooby-Doo? is an American animated mystery-comedy series. The show was broadcast from September 14, 2002 to July 21, 2006 on Kids' WB, a Saturday morning children's programming block on The WB Television Network. This is the ninth incarnation of the Scooby-Doo franchise, and features the main characters - Fred Jones, Daphne Blake, Velma Dinkley, Shaggy Rogers and Scooby-Doo - investigating appearances of supernatural creatures.

Series overview

Episodes

Season 1 (2002–03)

Season 2 (2003–04)

Season 3 (2005–06)

References

Lists of Scooby-Doo television series episodes
Lists of American children's animated television series episodes